Bruce Lake Station (also called Bruce Lake) is an unincorporated community in Union Township, Fulton County, Indiana.

History
Bruce Lake Station contained a post office from 1855 until 1942. The community took its name from Bruce Lake.

Geography

References

Unincorporated communities in Fulton County, Indiana
Unincorporated communities in Indiana